Tresenica or Shaking dance in English is a Macedonian oro from the region of Mariovo.

It is a typical women's dance with steady and proud movements and careful balance of the body. The dancers hold hands and begin their dance in semicircle.

See also
Music of North Macedonia

Further reading
Dimovski, Mihailo. (1977:46-51). Macedonian folk dances (Original in Macedonian: Македонски народни ора). Skopje: Naša kniga & Institut za folklor

External links
 Tresenica by the Ensemble of folk dances and songs "Skopje"

Macedonian dances
Circle dances